Donji Miholjac is a town in the Slavonia region of Croatia, on the river Drava and the border with Hungary.

Population
In the 2011 census, there were 9,491 inhabitants in the area, 95% of whom were Croats.

Settlements
There are seven settlements in the municipality:
 Donji Miholjac, population 6,240
 Golinci, population 431
 Miholjački Poreč, population 183
 Podgajci Podravski, population 651
 Radikovci, population 292
 Rakitovica, population 868
 Sveti Đurađ, population 826

History

In the late 19th and early 20th century, Donji Miholjac was a district capital in the Virovitica County of the Kingdom of Croatia-Slavonia. Its name comes from Saint Michael. During the time of Ancient Rome, it was called Mariniana. There are several suggested etymology for the name "Mariniana". One is that it comes from the Roman personal name "Marinus". The other is that it comes from the Indo-European roots *mory and *h1ny, so that it means "marshy valley". If so, the same root is seen in the names "Mursa" and "Marsonia".

References

External links

 
Donji Miholjac unofficial page 

Cities and towns in Croatia
Slavonia
Virovitica County
Croatia–Hungary border crossings
Municipalities of Osijek-Baranja County